USS Warrington may refer to the following ships of the United States Navy:

  was a modified  launched in 1910, served in World War I and decommissioned in 1920.
  was a  launched in 1937 and sunk in 1944 during the Great Atlantic Hurricane.
  was a  launched in 1945 and sold to Taiwan in 1973.

United States Navy ship names